Cheremissky (masculine), Cheremisskaya (feminine), or Cheremisskoye (neuter) is the name of several rural localities in Russia.

Modern localities
Cheremissky (rural locality), a settlement in Bolsheyelninsky Selsoviet of Kstovsky District in Nizhny Novgorod Oblast
Cheremisskoye, Kataysky District, Kurgan Oblast, a village in Ilyinsky Selsoviet of Kataysky District in Kurgan Oblast; 
Cheremisskoye, Shadrinsky District, Kurgan Oblast (or Cheremisskaya), a selo in Cheremissky Selsoviet of Shadrinsky District in Kurgan Oblast; 
Cheremisskoye, Nizhny Novgorod Oblast, a village in Bolsheyelninsky Selsoviet of Kstovsky District in Nizhny Novgorod Oblast
Cheremisskoye, Sverdlovsk Oblast, a selo in Rezhevsky District of Sverdlovsk Oblast
Cheremisskaya, Kirov Oblast, a village in Pokrovsky Rural Okrug of Kotelnichsky District in Kirov Oblast; 
Cheremisskaya, Sverdlovsk Oblast, a village in Kamensky District of Sverdlovsk Oblast

Abolished localities
Cheremisskoye, Kostroma Oblast, a village in Gorlovsky Selsoviet of Ponazyrevsky District of Kostroma Oblast; abolished on August 30, 2004

References

Notes

Sources